Ignacio Sánchez-Cuenca is a Spanish social scientist based at the Charles III University of Madrid. He has been the director of the Instituto Carlos III-Juan March since its creation in 2013 from CEACS.

Sánchez-Cuenca, who earned his doctorate in sociology at the Complutense University of Madrid, has served as associate professor of sociology at the Complutense University of Madrid, Universidad de Salamanca and associate professor in the Political Science Department at the Pompeu Fabra University in Barcelona. He has also been a visiting scholar in New York University and Yale University, and taught courses in methodology at the Centro de Investigaciones Sociológicas in Madrid.

His areas of study include terrorism and the General Agreement on Tariffs and Trade (GATT) negotiations.

Critique
Daniel Gascón, writing in the Mexican magazine Letras Libres, argued Sánchez-Cuenca's La desfachatez intelectual is something of a humorous fisking of his political targets, and gave it a mixed review.

Works
Controlling Governments (2008)
Más democracia y menos liberalismo (2010)
Años de cambios, años de crisis. Ocho años de gobiernos socialistas (2012)
Democracia y socialdemocracia. Homenaje a José María Maravall (2012)
Atado y mal atado. El suicidio institucional del franquismo y el surgimiento de la democracia (2014)
La impotencia democrática. Sobre la crisis política española (2014)
La desfachatez intelectual (2016)

References

Spanish sociologists
Year of birth missing (living people)
Living people
Complutense University of Madrid alumni
Academic staff of the Charles III University of Madrid
Academic staff of Pompeu Fabra University
Academic staff of the University of Salamanca
El País columnists